Erkki Paavolainen (17 May 1890, Kivennapa – 18 March 1960, Helsinki) was a Finnish journalist, educationist and politician. He was Minister of Social Affairs from 3 March to 20 October 1932. Paavolainen served as a Member of the Parliament of Finland from 1924 to 1927, from 1929 to 1933, from 1936 to 1947 and again from 1948 to 1951, representing the National Coalition Party. He was the younger brother of Pekka Paavolainen and the father of Jaakko Paavolainen.

References

1890 births
1960 deaths
People from Vyborg District
People from Viipuri Province (Grand Duchy of Finland)
National Coalition Party politicians
Government ministers of Finland
Members of the Parliament of Finland (1924–27)
Members of the Parliament of Finland (1929–30)
Members of the Parliament of Finland (1930–33)
Members of the Parliament of Finland (1936–39)
Members of the Parliament of Finland (1939–45)
Members of the Parliament of Finland (1945–48)
Members of the Parliament of Finland (1948–51)
Finnish people of World War II
University of Helsinki alumni